The 1957 Marshall Thundering Herd football team was an American football team that represented Marshall University in the Mid-American Conference (MAC) during the 1957 NCAA College Division football season. In its fifth season under head coach Herb Royer, the team compiled a 6–3 record (4–2 against conference opponents), finished in third place out of seven teams in the MAC, and outscored opponents by a total of 120 to 112. Jim Simpson and Herb Hess were the team captains. The team played its home games at Fairfield Stadium in Huntington, West Virginia.

Schedule

References

Marshall
Marshall Thundering Herd football seasons
Marshall Thundering Herd football